The Ministry of Infrastructure and Energy is a department of the Albanian Government, responsible for national climate policy and international cooperation on climate change, as well as energy issues, meteorology and national geological surveys, electricity, water, wastewater services and industry in Albania.

Subordinate institutions
 National Agency of Natural Resources
 Albanian Geological Survey
 Initiative for transparency in the extractive industry
 Technical and Industrial State Inspectorate
 National Nuclear Agency
 National Authority for Safety and Emergencies in Mines
 National Agency of Territorial Planning
 Central Technical Construction Archive
 Agency for Energy Efficiency
 Chemical Collection and Treatment Center
 Albanian Road Authority
 National Entity for the Investigation of Air Accidents/Incidents in Civil Aviation
 General Maritime Directorate
 Transport Institute
 General Directorate of Water Supply and Sewerage
 Directorate of Railway Inspection
 Civil Aviation Authority

Officeholders (1912–present)

See also 
Transport in Albania
Renewable energy in Albania
Council of Ministers (Albania)

References 

Politics of Albania
Infrastructure
1912 establishments in Albania